James Warren (born 6 May 1974) is a former British judoka, who won gold at the 2002 Commonwealth Games.

Judo career
Warren came to prominence when becoming champion of Great Britain, winning the half-lightweight division at the British Judo Championships in 1999 and 2000.

At the 2002 Commonwealth Games in Manchester, he won the gold medal in the under 66kg category, in the final he defeated Scotland's David Somerville. The following year in 2003, he won his third and last British Championship title.

Acting
During the latter part of his judo career and since retiring from judo, Warren has taken up acting and has appeared in several Guy Ritchie films.

References

External link

1974 births
Living people
English male judoka
Commonwealth Games gold medallists for England
Judoka at the 2002 Commonwealth Games
Commonwealth Games medallists in judo
Medallists at the 2002 Commonwealth Games